The Asgill Baronetcy, of London, was a title in the Baronetage of Great Britain. It was created on 17 April 1761 for Charles Asgill, a merchant banker and Lord Mayor of London between 1757 and 1758. The second Baronet was a general in the British Army. The title became extinct on his death in 1823.

Asgill baronets, of London (1761)
Sir Charles Asgill, 1st Baronet (1713–1788)
Sir Charles Asgill, 2nd Baronet (1762–1823)

References

Extinct baronetcies in the Baronetage of Great Britain